Nikita Kozlov (born November 29, 1992) is a Russian kickboxer, currently competing in the light heavyweight division of RCC Fair Fight. As of October 2022, he is ranked as the seventh best light heavyweight kickboxer in the world by Beyond Kick, and fifth best by Combat Press.

Kickboxing career
Kozlov faced Dominik Sívek at Road to ONE: Night of Warriors 17 on April 24, 2021. He won the fight by unanimous decision.

Kozlov faced Adel Zaripov at Fair Fight 15 on August 28, 2021, in his first fight at light heavyweight. He made a successful debut in a new weight class, as he knocked Zaripov out with a knee at the 2:07 minute mark of the opening round.

Kozlov faced Mitar Dugalić at RCC: Intro 17 on October 23, 2021. He won the fight by a third-round technical knockout, stopping Dugalić with a flurry of punches with just six seconds left in the bout. Kozlov next faced Alexey Dmitriev at RCC: Intro 18 on November 20, 2021. He won the fight by unanimous decision.

Kozlov faced Olivier Langlois-Ross at Fair Fight 16 on February 12, 2022, in his first fight of the year. He won the fight by unanimous decision. Kozlov was then booked to face Sekou Bangura at Fair Fight 17 on June 14, 2022. He won the fight by unanimous decision. Kozlov was booked to face the 2017 Glory Light Heavyweight Contender Tournament Winner Ariel Machado at Fair Fight 18 on July 15, 2022. He won the fight by unanimous decision. Kozlov faced Zinedine Hameur-Lain in his fourth fight of the year at RCC Fair Fight 19 on November 26, 2022. He won the fight by a second-round flying knee knockout.

Kozlov faced Fabio Alberto at RCC Fair Fight 20 on February 18, 2023.

Fight record

|-  style="background:#cfc;"
| 2023-02-18 || Win ||align=left| Fabio Alberto || RCC Fair Fight 20 || Yekaterinburg, Russia || KO (Right hook) || 2  || 1:11
|- style="background:#cfc;"
| 2022-11-26|| Win ||align=left| Zinedine Hameur-Lain || RCC Fair Fight 19 || Yekaterinburg, Russia || KO (Flying knee) || 2 || 1:36

|- style="background:#cfc;"
| 2022-07-15 || Win ||align=left| Ariel Machado || RCC Fair Fight 18 || Yekaterinburg, Russia || Decision (Unanimous) || 3 || 3:00
|-
|- style="background:#cfc;"
| 2022-06-14 || Win ||align=left| Sekou Bangoura || Fair Fight 17 || Yekaterinburg, Russia || Decision (Unanimous) || 3 || 3:00
|-
|- style="background:#cfc;"
| 2022-02-12 || Win ||align=left| Olivier Langlois-Ross || Fair Fight 16 || Yekaterinburg, Russia || Decision (Unanimous) || 3 || 3:00
|-
|- style="background:#cfc;"
| 2021-11-20 || Win ||align=left| Alexey Dmitriev || RCC: Intro 18 || Yekaterinburg, Russia || Decision (Unanimous) || 3 || 3:00
|-
|- style="background:#cfc;"
| 2021-10-23 || Win ||align=left| Mitar Dugalić || RCC: Intro 17 || Yekaterinburg, Russia || TKO (Punches) || 3 || 2:54
|-
|- style="background:#cfc;"
| 2021-08-28 || Win ||align=left| Adel Zaripov || Fair Fight 15 || Yekaterinburg, Russia || KO (Knee) || 1 || 2:07
|-
|- style="background:#cfc;"
| 2021-04-24 || Win ||align=left| Dominik Sívek || Road to ONE: Night of Warriors 17 || Prague, Czech Republic || Decision (Unanimous) || 3 || 3:00
|-
|- style="background:#cfc;"
| 2021-03-06 || Win ||align=left| Evgeny Nikitin || Fair Fight 14 || Yekaterinburg, Russia || Decision (Unanimous) || 3 || 3:00
|-
|- style="background:#cfc;"
| 2020-11-28 || Win ||align=left| Nikita Radyakin || Road to ONE 4: Fair Fight 13 || Yekaterinburg, Russia || Decision (Unanimous) || 3 || 3:00
|-
|- style="background:#cfc;"
| 2020-08-29 || Win ||align=left| Andrey Lobanov || Fair Fight 12 || Yekaterinburg, Russia || Decision (Unanimous) || 3 || 3:00
|-
|- style="background:#cfc;"
| 2020-01-26 || Win ||align=left| Igor Vorobyov || Fair Fight Lite || Yekaterinburg, Russia || Decision (Unanimous) || 3 || 3:00
|-
|- style="background:#fbb;"
| 2019-07-08 || Loss ||align=left| Constantin Maleș || Fair Fight 9 || Yekaterinburg, Russia || Decision (Unanimous) || 3 || 3:00
|-
|- style="background:#cfc;"
| 2019-02-02|| Win ||align=left| Grigory Maltsev || Fair Fight 7 || Yekaterinburg, Russia || Decision (Unanimous) || 3 || 3:00
|-
| colspan=9 | Legend:    

|-  style="background:#fbb"
| 2019-09-27|| Loss||align=left| Mikita Shostak||  WAKO K-1 World Grand Prix 2019, Semi Final || Prague, Czech Republic || Decision (3-0) || 3 || 2:00
|-
! style=background:white colspan=9 |

|-  style="background:#cfc"
| 2019-09-26||Win ||align=left| Maksymilian Bratkowicz||  WAKO K-1 World Grand Prix 2019, Quarter Final || Prague, Czech Republic || Decision (3-0) || 3 || 2:00

|-  style="background:#cfc"
| 2019-09-25||Win ||align=left| Nikolas Stamidis||  WAKO K-1 World Grand Prix 2019, First Round || Prague, Czech Republic || Decision (3-0) || 3 || 2:00
|-
| colspan=9 | Legend:

See also
 List of male kickboxers

References

Living people
1992 births
Russian male kickboxers
Middleweight kickboxers
Light heavyweight kickboxers
Sportspeople from Yekaterinburg